Gunnar Kilgas (8 May 1926 Narva – 6 August 2005 Tallinn) was an Estonian actor and theatre director.

In 1949 he graduated from Estonian State Theatre Institute. 1951-1960 he was an actor at Vanemuine Theatre. 1960-1969 he was an actor and director at Estonian Drama Theatre. 1969-1986 he was a director at Estonian Television's Teleteater.

Filmography

 1947 Elu tsitadellis (feature film; role: Karl Miilas)
 1957 Pöördel (feature film; role: Raivo Kotkas)
 1959 Kutsumata külalised (feature film; role: Salusoo)
 1971 Valge laev (feature film; role: Ilmar Tomson)
 1972 Verekivi (feature film; role: Ducker)
 1973 Tuli öös (feature film; role: Form master)
 1987 Metsluiged (feature film; role: Father-King)
 1988 Vernanda (feature film; role: Windshield wiper)
 1997 Minu Leninid (feature film; role: German officer)

References

1926 births
2005 deaths
Estonian male stage actors
Estonian male film actors
Estonian male television actors
Estonian male radio actors
20th-century Estonian male actors
21st-century Estonian male actors
Estonian theatre directors
People from Narva